Marcos Vernal (born 22 November 1973) is a Colombian boxer. He competed in the men's bantamweight event at the 1996 Summer Olympics.

References

1973 births
Living people
Colombian male boxers
Olympic boxers of Colombia
Boxers at the 1996 Summer Olympics
Place of birth missing (living people)
Bantamweight boxers
20th-century Colombian people